Peter Barr (born 7 October 1950) is a Canadian rower. He competed in the men's double sculls event at the 1972 Summer Olympics.

References

1950 births
Living people
Canadian male rowers
Olympic rowers of Canada
Rowers at the 1972 Summer Olympics
Sportspeople from Kingston, Ontario